Phlegethontia is an extinct genus of aïstopod stegocephalians from the Carboniferous and Permian periods of Europe and North America.

"Dolichosoma" longissima, named by Antonin Fritsch in 1875, has been reassigned to the genus Phlegethontia and is now considered to be P. longissima. "Dolichosoma" has been considered to be a nomen nudum because the holotype was inadequately described through a layer of matrix by Thomas Henry Huxley in 1867.

References

External links
Fossil picture.

Aistopods
Carboniferous fish of Europe
Carboniferous fish of North America
Permian fish of Europe
Permian fish of North America
Taxa named by Edward Drinker Cope
Fossil taxa described in 1871